USNS Millinocket (JHSV-3/T-EPF-3) (ex-Fortitude) is the third , which is operated by the United States Navys Military Sealift Command and was built in Mobile, Alabama.

Capabilities
The EPF can transport US Army and US Marine Corps company-sized units with their vehicles, or reconfigure to become a troop transport for an infantry battalion.  
 
It has a flight deck for helicopter operations and a loading ramp that allows vehicles to quickly drive on and off the ship. The ramp is suitable for the types of austere piers and quay walls common in developing countries. EPF has a shallow draft (under ).

Construction and career 
On 30 May 2012, Secretary of the Navy Ray Mabus announced in Fall River, Massachusetts that the third Expeditionary Fast Transport, previously having been named Fortitude by the United States Army before the transfer of the EPF program to the Navy, would be named USNS Millinocket. Since the ship will be operated by the Military Sealift Command and not the United States Navy itself, it will carry the USNS designation and not USS. The ship is the second U.S. Navy vessel to be named Millinocket (after the town in Maine), the first being a freighter sunk by a U-boat in 1942.

The ship is laid down on 3 May 2012 and launched on 5 June 2013 by Austal USA. She was commissioned on 21 March 2014.

In 2016 Millinocket will transport items to test with Fort Worth the LCS expeditionary maintenance capability.

References

External links

 

Transports of the United States Navy
2013 ships
Spearhead-class Joint High Speed Vessels